The Superconducting Super Collider (SSC) (also nicknamed the desertron) was a particle accelerator complex under construction in the vicinity of Waxahachie, Texas.

The laboratory director was Roy Schwitters, a physicist at the University of Texas at Austin. Department of Energy administrator Louis Ianniello served as its first project director, followed by Joe Cipriano, who came to the SSC Project from the Pentagon in May 1990. After 22.5 km (14 mi) of tunnel had been bored and about 2 billion dollars spent, the project was cancelled by the US Congress in 1993.

Proposal and development 

The supercollider was formally discussed in the 1984 National Reference Designs Study, which examined the technical and economic feasibility of a machine with the design energy of 20 TeV per proton.

Early in 1983, HEPAP (High-Energy Physics Advisory Panel) formed the New Facilities for the US High-Energy Physics Program subpanel. Led by Stanford University physicist Stanley Wojcicki, and charged with making recommendations “for a forefront United States High Energy Physics Program in the next five to ten years.” the HEPAP subpanel recommended that the US build the Superconducting Super Collider.

Fermilab director and subsequent Nobel physics prizewinner Leon Lederman was a very prominent early supporter – some sources say the architect or proposer – of the Superconducting Super Collider project, as well as a major proponent and advocate throughout its lifetime. 

A Central Design Group (CDG) was organized in California at the Lawrence Berkeley Laboratory, which became the gathering place for physicists to come and support the SSC design effort. In the mid-1980s, many leading high-energy physicists, including theorist J. David Jackson of Berkeley, Chris Quigg of Fermilab, Maury Tigner of Cornell, Stanley Wojcicki, as well as Lederman, Chicago’s James Cronin, Harvard theorist Sheldon Glashow, and Roy Schwitters, continued their efforts to promote the Super Collider.

An extensive U.S. Department of Energy review was also done during the mid-1980s.

Partial construction and financial issues

During the design and the first construction stage, a heated debate ensued about the high cost of the project. In 1987, Congress was told the project could be completed for $4.4 billion, and it gained the enthusiastic support of Speaker Jim Wright of nearby Fort Worth, Texas. A recurring argument was the contrast with NASA's contribution to the International Space Station (ISS), a similar dollar amount. Critics of the project (Congressmen representing other US states and  scientists working in non-SSC fields who felt the money would be better spent on their own fields) argued that the US could not afford both of them.

Estimates of the additional cost caused by not using existing physical and human infrastructure at Fermilab in Illinois range from $495 million to $3.28 billion.

Leaders hoped to get financial support from Europe, Canada, Japan, Russia, and India. This was hindered by promotion of the project as promoting American superiority. European funding remained at CERN, which was already working on the Large Hadron Collider. India pledged $50 million, but talks with Japan foundered over trade tensions in the automobile industry. A US-Japanese trade mission where SSC funding was supposed to be discussed ended in the George H. W. Bush vomiting incident.

Congress began appropriating annual funding for the project. In 1992, it was opposed by a majority of the House of Representatives (231-181), but was included in the final reconciled budget due to support in the Senate (62-32).
Early in 1993, a group supported by funds from project contractors organized a public relations campaign to lobby Congress directly in support of the project.
In February, the General Accounting Office reported a $630 million overrun in the $1.25 billion construction budget. By March, the New York Times reported the estimated total cost had grown to $8.4 billion. In June, the non-profit Project on Government Oversight released a draft audit report by the Department of Energy's Inspector General heavily criticizing the Super Collider for its high costs and poor management by officials in charge of it.
The Inspector General investigated $500,000 in questionable expenses over three years, including $12,000 for Christmas parties, $25,000 for catered lunches, and $21,000 for the purchase and maintenance of office plants. The report also concluded that there was inadequate documentation for $203 million in project spending, or 40% of the money spent up to that point.

In 1993, Clinton tried to prevent the cancellation by asking Congress to continue "to support this important and challenging effort" through completion because "abandoning the SSC at this point would signal that the United States is compromising its position of leadership in basic science".

Cancellation

After $2 billion had been spent ($400 million by the host state of Texas, the rest by the Department of Energy), the House of Representatives rejected funding on October 19, 1993, and Senate negotiators failed to restore it.
Following Rep. Jim Slattery's successful orchestration in the House, President Clinton signed the bill that finally cancelled the project on October 30, 1993, stating regret at the "serious loss" for science.

Many factors contributed to the cancellation: rising cost estimates (to $12bn); poor management by physicists and Department of Energy officials; the end of the need to prove the supremacy of American science with the collapse of the Soviet Union and the end of the Cold War; belief that many smaller scientific experiments of equal merit could be funded for the same cost; Congress's desire to generally reduce spending (the United States was running a $255bn budget deficit); the reluctance of Texas Governor Ann Richards; and President Bill Clinton's initial lack of support for a project begun during the administrations of Richards's predecessor, Bill Clements, and Clinton's predecessors, Ronald Reagan and George H. W. Bush.  The project's cancellation was also eased by opposition from within the scientific community. Prominent condensed matter physicists, such as Philip W. Anderson and Nicolaas Bloembergen, testified before Congress opposing the project. They argued that, although the SSC would certainly conduct high-quality research, it was not the only way to acquire new fundamental knowledge, as some of its supporters claimed, and so was unreasonably expensive. Scientific critics of the SSC pointed out that basic research in other areas, such as condensed matter physics and materials science, was underfunded compared to high energy physics, despite the fact that those fields were more likely to produce applications with technological and economic benefits.

Reactions to the cancellation
Steven Weinberg, a Nobel laureate in Physics, places the cancellation of the SSC in the context of a bigger national and global socio-economic crisis, including a general crisis in funding for science research and for the provision of adequate education, healthcare, transportation and communication infrastructure, and criminal justice and law enforcement.

Leon Lederman, a promoter and advocate from its early days, wrote his 1993 popular science book The God Particle: If the Universe Is the Answer, What Is the Question? – which sought to promote awareness of the significance of the work which necessitated such a project – in the context of the project's last years and loss of congressional support.

The closing of the SSC had adverse consequences for the southern part of the Dallas–Fort Worth Metroplex, and resulted in a mild recession, most evident in those parts of Dallas which lay south of the Trinity River. When the project was cancelled,  of tunnel and 17 shafts to the surface were already dug, and nearly two billion dollars had already been spent on the massive facility.

Comparison with the Large Hadron Collider 

The SSC's planned collision energy of 2 x 20 = 40 TeV was roughly three times that of the 2 x 6.5 = 13 TeV (as of June 2015) of its European counterpart, the Large Hadron Collider (LHC) at CERN in Geneva. However, the planned luminosity was only one tenth of the design luminosity of the LHC.

Although some claimed that the SSC cost was largely due to the massive civil engineering project of digging a huge tunnel, that was somewhat of a distortion. The tunneling and conventional facility buildout budget was only about ten percent of the total budgeted cost (1.1 billion dollars out of a total cost of 10 billion). The major cost item was the magnets, still in laboratory development phase, consequently with a higher level of uncertainty attached to the final cost.

The LHC's advantage in terms of cost was the use of the pre-existing engineering infrastructure and 27 km long cavern of the Large Electron–Positron Collider, and its use of a different, innovative magnet design to bend the higher energy particles into the available tunnel. The LHC eventually cost the equivalent of about 5 billion US dollars to build. The total operating budget of CERN runs to about $1 billion per year. The Large Hadron Collider became operational in August 2008.

In a 2021 interview, Schwitters speculated that, had the project been completed, it would have led to the discovery of the Higgs boson particle 10 years before its eventual discovery in Switzerland and attracted an equivalent number of visitors to North Texas as CERN's 120,000 per year.

Cross sections of preform superconductor rods from sample runs

Current status of site

After the project was cancelled, the main site was deeded to Ellis County, Texas, and the county tried numerous times to sell the property. The property was sold in August 2006 to an investment group led by the late J.B. Hunt.

In 2009, Collider Data Center had contracted with GVA Cawley to market the site as a data center.  In 2012, chemical company Magnablend bought the property and facilities against some opposition from the local community.  The buildings in the facility, which had become prime spots for thieves and drug parties, were renovated and were re-opened in 2013 by Magnablend. The facility makes a range of oil field products for the energy service industry.

In popular culture
"Supercollider," a 1993 song by the Boston-based alternative band Tribe, describes the point of view of a scientist hired to help build the (then-uncancelled) project.

John G. Cramer's 1997 hard science fiction novel Einstein's Bridge centers around a fictional version of the Superconducting Super Collider.

A Hole In Texas is a 2004 novel by Herman Wouk, which describes the adventures of a high-energy physicist following the surprise announcement that a Chinese physicist  had discovered the long-sought Higgs boson.  Parts of the plot are based on the aborted Superconducting Super Collider project.

On the January 21, 2021 episode of Young Sheldon the supercollider is mentioned when Sheldon Cooper's (Iain Armitage) mentor Dr. John Sturgis (Wallace Shawn) gets a new job there. A subsequent episode on the April 1, 2021 episode shows an exterior shot of the facility with Dr. Sturgis receiving a phone call from Sheldon's grandmother (Annie Potts).

In 2021, the project was cited as a case study of the hypothetical demon of Bureaucratic Chaos, which "blocks good things from happening" at the United States Department of Energy.

See also

 DESY
 Fermilab
 Large Hadron Collider
 UNK proton accelerator – a similar competing Soviet project discontinued at about the same time in Russia
 Future Circular Collider study - design project (as of 2017) including the concept of a circular collider with a circumference of 100 km

Notes

References 

Riordan, Michael, Hoddeson, Lillian, and Kolb, Adrienne W. (2015). "Tunnel Visions: The Rise and Fall of the Superconducting Super Collider." U. of Chicago Press. 

 Lederman, Leon; Teresi, Dick (1994). "The God Particle: If the Universe Is the Answer, What Is the Question?". Delta.  .
 Wouk, Herman (2004). "A Hole In Texas", fiction. Little, Brown. .
 Sterling, Bruce (July 1994). "The Dead Collider".  Fantasy & Science Fiction Science column. Issue #13, 1994.
 
 
  
 Drell, Sidney D., Chair. (May 2004). "The Superconducting Super Collider Project: A Summary" (archive of  original. U.S. Department of Energy, High Energy Physics Advisory Panel's Subpanel on Vision for the Future of High Energy Physics.
 Wienands, H.-Ulrich, ed. (1997). "The SSC Low Energy Booster"  IEEE Press.

External links

"The High Water Mark of American Science". (photo tour). American Physical Society Physics Central blog, March 24, 2011.
Guide to the Superconducting Super Collider (SSC) Collection 1986-1988
 A bridge too far: The demise of the Superconducting Super Collider

Cancelled projects
Particle accelerators
Buildings and structures in Ellis County, Texas
Unfinished buildings and structures in the United States